The End of the Game is an album by British blues rock musician Peter Green, who was the founder of Fleetwood Mac and a member from 1967–1970. Released in 1970, this was his first solo album, recorded in June of that year, only a month after leaving Fleetwood Mac.

The style of this album is a radical departure from his work with Fleetwood Mac, consisting of edited pieces of a long studio jam. Musically, it is experimental and free-form, with very loose or non-existent musical structure, and all the tracks are instrumentals. Apart from Green's two singles from this period, "Heavy Heart" / "No Way Out" and "Beasts Of Burden" / "Uganda Woman" (recorded with Nigel Watson), this album bears little resemblance to any of Green's other recorded work.

The bassist on this album is Alex Dmochowski, otherwise known as "Erroneous", from The Aynsley Dunbar Retaliation and Heavy Jelly, who also played bass on the Frank Zappa albums Apostrophe('), Waka/Jawaka (Hot Rats II) and The Grand Wazoo, and had a brief stint with John Mayall.

Track listing
All tracks composed by Peter Green

Side One
"Bottoms Up" – 9:05
"Timeless Time" – 2:37
"Descending Scale" – 8:17

Side Two
"Burnt Foot" – 5:16
"Hidden Depth" – 4:54
"The End of the Game" – 5:08

Personnel
Peter Green – guitar
Zoot Money – piano
Nick Buck – keyboards
Alex Dmochowski – bass guitar
Godfrey McLean – drums, percussion

Production
Produced by Peter Green
Recording engineer – Martin Birch
Cover design by Afracadabra
Photographs – Keystone

References

Peter Green (musician) albums
1970 albums
Reprise Records albums
Albums produced by Peter Green (musician)